Wamos Air, formerly named Pullmantur Air, is a Spanish charter airline headquartered in Madrid. It mostly operates leisure charter flights from its main base at Adolfo Suárez Madrid–Barajas Airport and also operates aircraft for other entities.

History
In 2014, former majority owner Royal Caribbean Group (which also owned now defunct Pullmantur Cruises) sold a 81 percent state of Pullmantur Air to investor Springwater Capital which subsequently also led to a rebrand to Wamos Air.

In 2022, Wamos Air announced it would end all scheduled services to focus solely on passenger and cargo charter and ACMI operations. The airline did serve few destinations throughout the Caribbean, which were subsequently handed over to Iberojet.

From 15 November 2022 to 28 October 2023, Wamos Air will operate the Auckland - Perth route daily using their own aircraft (A330-200), crew and pilots on behalf of Air New Zealand.

Destinations

Charter operations
Wamos Air offers short and long-term charter operations as well as ACMI services for passenger and cargo flights to other airlines such as Condor, tour operators and other businesses such as sports clubs. One of its major customers had been its now defunct sister company Pullmantur Cruises.

In 2021 and 2022 Wamos Air had set up Tallinn Airport as its technical stopover between Asia and North America cargo routes.

Former scheduled destinations
As of December 2019, Wamos Air offered scheduled flights under its own brand name to the following destinations which were since all terminated.

Fleet

Current fleet 
As of February 2023, the Wamos Air fleet consists of the following aircraft:

Retired fleet 
Wamos Air previously also operated the following aircraft types:
 Boeing 747-400

References

External links

Airlines of Spain
Airlines established in 2003
Royal Caribbean Group
Spanish companies established in 2003